The Hatch Islands are a small group of rocky islands lying  east of Ivanoff Head at the head of Vincennes Bay of Wilkes Land, Antarctica. The islands mark the division between Knox Coast and Budd Coast. They were named after Ernest B. Hatch, a tractor driver on Operation Windmill.

References

External links

Islands of Wilkes Land